Local elections were held in the Makati on May 14, 2007, within the Philippine general election. The voters will elect for the elective local posts in the city: the mayor, vice mayor, two district representatives, and councilors, eight in each of the city's two legislative districts.

Background
Incumbents Jejomar Binay and Ernesto Mercado are running for their third consecutive term as mayor and vice mayor of Makati, respectively. Their main opponent, Senator Lito Lapid announced his candidacy for mayoral bid, with second district councilor Nemesio Yabut Jr. as his running mate. Should Lapid lose, he would return to the Senate to finish his unexpired term that would last until 2010. The other candidate is businessman Elias Dulalia.

Candidates

Representative

1st District
Teodoro Locsin Jr. is the incumbent.

2nd District
Incumbent Butz Aquino is term-limited.

Mayor

Vice Mayor

City Council

1st District

|-bgcolor=black
|colspan=5|

2nd District

|-bgcolor=black
|colspan=5|

References

Elections in Makati
2007 Philippine local elections
2007 elections in Metro Manila